Chronicles is an album by American group Audiomachine, released on 23 March 2012. The album peaked at number five on the Billboard Top Classical Albums chart.

Track listing

Charts

References

External links
 

2012 albums
Audiomachine albums